Marios Demetriades (born 27 August 1971) is a Cypriot politician who was appointed Minister of Transport, Communications and Works in the Council of Ministers of Cyprus on 14 March 2014.

He was born in Paphos and educated at the University of East Anglia graduating with a First Class BSc in Business, Finance and Economics in 1993. He subsequently held various positions at Piraeus Bank (Cyprus), and is a Non-Executive Director of FxPro.

References

1971 births
Living people
People from Paphos
Alumni of the University of East Anglia
Cyprus Ministers of Communications and Works